The striped treehunter (Thripadectes holostictus) is a species of bird in the family Furnariidae with a dusky-brown coloring with prominent buff streaking on the wings, throat, and breast. It is found in humid to wet montane forest that range locally in the Andes from west Venezuela to west Bolivia (Bolivia, Colombia, Ecuador, Peru, and Venezuela) most often at elevations of 1500–2500 m. It is most often mistaken for and with the larger flammulated treehunter due to many physical and behavioral similarities.

Taxonomy
The striped treehunter belongs to the order Passeriformes in the family Furnariidae.  Passeriformes encompasses more than half of the known avian species which are known as perching birds. The Furnariidae are ovenbirds which are native to Central America and South America which are a diverse group of insectivores known for their "oven-like" nests. The genus Thripadectes contains six close relatives of the striped treehunter. There are three subspecies:
Thripadectes holostictus holostictus
Thripadectes holostictus moderatus
Thripadectes holostictus striatidorsus

Description

The average size is 20–21 cm in length. Dorsally, the striped treehunter has prominent streaks with buffing on the wings and a rufescent rump and tail. Ventrally, the striped treehunter is rufous with buff streaking on the throat and breast. The straight beak is black in color. One distinguishing characteristic from woodcreepers is the rounded rectrices tips while woodcreepers have spines at the tips

Voice
The song is a fast-paced, rising and falling tone "tr'r'r'R'E'E'E'E'E'R'r'r'r'r". The call is a sharp "kwi-di-dik".

Distribution and habitat
The striped treehunter greatly varies in abundance where it ranges from uncommon to fairly common locally and regionally. It is most common in Ecuador (especially in Pichincha Province) where it is uncommon in Colombia and Venezuela. Being a shy bird, it is most often noticed through its vocalizations instead of visual observation.

It is commonly found in the undergrowth of montane forest in subtropic and temperate zones of both Andean slopes with abundant mosses, epiphytes, and dense understory. It is most often seen at elevations of 1500–2500 m, but varies by country (2,000–2,300 m in Ecuador, 100–2,700 m in Colombia, 1,800–2,000 m in Venezuela).

Behavior
The striped treehunter is a furtive species; it is difficult to observe, often exhibiting similar behavior to that of the flammulated treehunter.

Breeding
The birds often burrow into a steep bank or vegetation-covered roadcut.

Feeding
The birds forage in dense cover 1–2 m above the ground, favoring Chusquea bamboo stands. Largely solitary birds, they are not commonly found in mixed flocks.

References

External links
 Various vocalizations

striped treehunter
Birds of the Northern Andes
striped treehunter
striped treehunter
striped treehunter
Taxonomy articles created by Polbot